Georgios Argiropoulos (born 20 January 1970) is a Greek racewalker. He competed in the men's 50 kilometres walk at the 2004 Summer Olympics.

References

External links
 

1970 births
Living people
Athletes (track and field) at the 2004 Summer Olympics
Greek male racewalkers
Olympic athletes of Greece